Tapeta Tetopata (16 January 1954 – 22 March 2021) was a French Polynesian politician. She was a member of Tapura Huiraatira.

Biography 
Tetopata was born in Teahupoo, French Polynesia. In 1998 she was elected to the Taiarapu-Ouest municipal council, and in 2017 she became the first deputy mayor of the council.

In 2018 she was elected to the Assembly of French Polynesia as a representative for the Windward Islands.

Tetopata died in March 2021 after an illness. She was replaced as an MP by Maeva Bourgade.

References 

1954 births
2021 deaths
Members of the Assembly of French Polynesia
French Polynesian women in politics
Tapura Huiraatira politicians
People from Tahiti